Advanced Alchemy of Music is the tenth studio album by the German electronic composer Peter Frohmader, released independently in 1994.

Track listing

Personnel 
Adapted from the Advanced Alchemy of Music liner notes.
 Peter Frohmader – instruments, musical arrangement, recording, mastering, illustrations, design

Release history

References 

1994 albums
Peter Frohmader albums